The Treaty of Aranjuez may refer to:

 Treaty of Aranjuez (1752), which recognizes Austrian and Spanish interests in Italy
 Treaty of Aranjuez (1777), by which France and Spain define their colonies in Santo Domingo
 Treaty of Aranjuez (1779), by which Spain joins the American Revolutionary War against Great Britain
 Treaty of Aranjuez (1780), by which Spain cedes territories to Morocco
 Treaty of Aranjuez (1801), which confirms the Third Treaty of San Ildefonso in which Spain returned the colonial territory of Louisiana to France.